The Market House, in Monaghan, Ireland, was designed by Colonel William Hayes of Avondale, Rathdrum, County Wicklow, and stands in the middle of Market Square. Completed in 1792, the building is of five bays in length with the centre three arches projected with a secondary pediment. The outer bays contain blank windows. The ends of the Market House have large rusticated arches flanked by round headed niches. Above all the arches are inset panels with festoons while the blank windows and niches have medallions. At the eastern end the pediment contains a carved Conygham (later Rossmore) coat of arms.

Today

After lying empty for many years, the Department of Arts, Sports and Tourism awarded Monaghan County Council €746,000 in 2001 to refurbish the Market House as an arts venue. The development work started in August 2002 and was completed in February 2003. The building was officially opened by the Minister for Arts, Sports and Tourism on 28 November 2003. This new venue is suitable for arts events such as exhibitions, musical performances, readings, workshops and rehearsals.

This is the first Capital arts project in County Monaghan to receive Central Government funding.

References

See also
 Market Houses in the Republic of Ireland

Art museums and galleries in the Republic of Ireland
Buildings and structures in Monaghan (town)
Monaghan